Photorhabdus temperata is a species of bacteria. It has been divided into 6 subspecies. It is pathogenic to certain insects.

References

Further reading

External links
LPSN
Type strain of Photorhabdus temperata at BacDive -  the Bacterial Diversity Metadatabase

Bacteria described in 1999